Raymond Heffernan (born 26 January 1963) is an Irish former hurler. At club level he played with Glenmore and was also a member of the Kilkenny senior hurling team. He usually lined out at midfield or as a forward.

Career

Heffernan first came to prominence at juvenile and underage levels with the Glenmore club before eventually joining the club's top adult team. After junior and intermediate successes, he went on to win a total of five County Senior Championship titles and was team captain for the All-Ireland Club Championship success in 1991. Heffernan first appeared on the inter-county scene as part of the Kilkenny team that won the All-Ireland Minor Championship title in 1981, before later winning an All-Ireland Under-21 Championship title in 1984. His underage and club successes saw him drafted onto the Kilkenny senior hurling team alongside his brother Christy in 1984. Over the course of the following decade Heffernan made a number of Walsh Cup, National League and championship appearances but failed to break onto the starting fifteen on a regular basis. He was a non-playing substitute for two All-Ireland finals and, after defeat by Tipperary in 1991, claimed a winners' medal against Galway in 1993. Heffernan's other honours include three Leinster Championship medals.

Honours

Team

Glenmore
All-Ireland Senior Club Hurling Championship: 1991 (c)
Leinster Senior Club Hurling Championship: 1990 (c), 1995
Kilkenny Senior Hurling Championship: 1987, 1990 (c), 1992 (c), 1995, 1999
Kilkenny Intermediate Hurling Championship: 1981
Kilkenny Junior Hurling Championship: 1980

Kilkenny
All-Ireland Senior Hurling Championship: 1993
Leinster Senior Hurling Championship: 1986, 1991, 1993
All-Ireland Under-21 Hurling Championship: 1984
Leinster Under-21 Hurling Championship: 1982, 1984
All-Ireland Minor Hurling Championship: 1981
Leinster Minor Hurling Championship: 1981

Individual

Awards
Kilkenny Sports Star Hurling Award: 1981

References

1963 births
Living people
Glenmore hurlers
Kilkenny inter-county hurlers